is a passenger railway station in the city of Matsudo, Chiba Prefecture Japan, operated by East Japan Railway Company (JR East).

Lines
Kita-Kogane is served by the Jōban Line and is 22.0 km from the terminus of the line at Nippori Station in Tokyo.

Station layout
The station is an elevated station with a single island platform serving two tracks, and the station building underneath. The station is staffed.

Platforms

History
Kita-Kogane Station was opened on May 1, 1911 as a station on the Japanese Government Railways (JGR), which became the Japan National Railways (JNR) after World War II. Kita-Kogane Station was absorbed into the JR East network upon the privatization of the JNR on April 1, 1987.

Passenger statistics
In fiscal 2019, the station was used by an average of 24,335 passengers daily.

See also
 List of railway stations in Japan

References

External links

  JR East Station information 

Railway stations in Chiba Prefecture
Railway stations in Japan opened in 1911
Jōban Line
Matsudo